Schizothorax microcephalus is a species of ray-finned fish in the genus Schizothorax from the Panj River.

References 

Schizothorax
Fish described in 1877